Charles Dye is a Grammy-nominated and Latin Grammy-winning record producer, engineer and mixer from Hollywood, Florida, USA.

Grammy
In 2001, Dye received a Latin Grammy for Best Engineered Album for Thalía's Arrasando.

Other production credits include John Ralston, Robi Draco Rosa, Ricky Martin, Jon Bon Jovi, Julio Iglesias, Sammy Hagar, Billie Myers, Jon Secada and Jenna Drey, as well as recording Lauryn Hill, Shakira, Aerosmith, Jennifer Lopez, Thalía, Hanson and Gloria Estefan.

References

Record producers from Florida
American audio engineers
People from Hollywood, Florida
Living people
Musicians from Florida
Place of birth missing (living people)
Year of birth missing (living people)